The  was a 14-cylinder, air-cooled, twin-row radial aircraft engine developed by Mitsubishi Heavy Industries in Japan in 1934 for the Imperial Japanese Navy. The Mitsubishi model designation for this engine was A8 while it was an experimental project; in service, it was known as the MK8 "Kinsei" by the Navy. In 1941 the engine was adopted by Army, receiving designation Ha-112 (later Ha-112-I, 1,300hp Army Type 1). In May 1943 it received Ha-33 unified designation code.

Design and development 
Early Kinsei models (1 and 2) had A4 internal designation and their cylinder and detail design was based on the single-row, 9-cylinder air-cooled Pratt and Whitney R-1690 Hornet.

In 1933 engine underwent a major redesign and redesignated A8. Head layout was reversed to allow exhaust exit to the rear, reducing back-pressure and allowing for a cleaner installation. Compression ratio increased from 5.3:1 to 6.0:1. These changes resulted in a significant performance uplift, compared to previous variants.

Kinsei 41 saw ever further increase in compression ratio from 6.0:1 to 6.6:1, and a larger supercharger. It's also the first variant to receive a two-digit model numbers. 40 series remained in production from 1936 till the end of the war.

Kinsei 50 series saw the final compression ratio increase to 7.0:1. Indirect fuel injection was fitted as well as a larger two-speed supercharger.

Kinsei 60 series was introduction of direct injection and later, a turbo-supercharger. Its development was run parallel to 50 series. Production started in 1940 and lasted till the end of the war.

Variants

Early (A4) variants 
Data from Goodwin
Kinsei 1
 at 2300 rpm at takeoff
 at 2100 rpm at sea level
Kinsei 2
 at 2350 rpm at takeoff
 at 2100 rpm at

Late (A8) variants 
Data from Goodwin
Kinsei 3
 at 2150 rpm at 
Kinsei 41
 at 2500 rpm at 
 at 2500 rpm at 
Higher compression ratio, supercharger
Kinsei 42
 at 2500 rpm at 
 at 2500 rpm at 
Air pump
Kinsei 43
 at 2400 rpm at sea level
 at 2400 rpm at 
De-rated for economy
Model 44
 at sea level
 at 
Machine gun synchroniser
Kinsei 45
 at sea level
 at 
Kinsei 46
 at sea level
 at 
De-rated for extreme economy
Kinsei 51 (MK8A)
 at 2500 rpm at 
 at 2500 rpm at 
Redesigned cylinder head, added indirect fuel injection, larger two-speed supercharger
Kinsei 52 (MK8B) (Ha-112-I)
 at 2500 rpm at 
 at 2500 rpm at 
Added water injection
Kinsei 53 (MK8C)
 at 2500 rpm at 
 at 2500 rpm at 
Higher pressure oil pump
Kinsei 54 (MK8D)
 at 2500 rpm at 
 at 2500 rpm at 
Added machine gun synchroniser
Model 61 (Ha-112-II)
 at 
 at 
Added direct fuel injection
Kinsei 62 (MK8P)
 at 2600 rpm at 
 at 2600 rpm at 
Kinsei 62 Ru (Ha-112-II Ru)
 at 2600 rpm at 
 at 2600 rpm at 
 at 2600 rpm at 
Ru-102 turbo-supercharger

Applications
 Aichi D3A
 Aichi E13A 
 Aichi E16A
 Aichi M6A2
 Kawanishi H6K
 Kawanishi N1K5-J
 Kawasaki Ki-96
 Kawasaki Ki-100
 Kawasaki Ki-102
 Mitsubishi A6M8
 Mitsubishi B5M
 Mitsubishi G3M
 Mitsubishi Ki-46-III
 Nakajima/Mahshu Ki-116
 Showa/Nakajima L2D2-L2D5
 Yokosuka D4Y3-D4Y4

Specifications (Kinsei-44)

See also

References

Bibliography

 Matsuoka Hisamitsu, Nakanishi Masayoshi. The History of Mitsubishi Aero Engines 1915–1945. Miki Press, Japan, 2005. 
 Gunston, Bill. World Encyclopaedia of Aero Engines. Cambridge, England. Patrick Stephens Limited, 1989. 
 Jane's Fighting Aircraft of World War II. London. Studio Editions Ltd, 1989. 
 Peattie, Mark R., Sunburst: The Rise of Japanese Naval Air Power 1909-1941, Annapolis, Maryland: Naval Institute Press, 2001, 

Aircraft air-cooled radial piston engines
1930s aircraft piston engines
Kinsei